Dryocoetes autographus is a species of weevil native to Europe.

References

Curculionidae
Beetles of Europe
Beetles described in 1837
Taxa named by Julius Theodor Christian Ratzeburg